Luke James Boyd (born June 13, 1984) is an American singer, songwriter and actor. He began his musical career singing background for R&B artist Tyrese, where he met and was soon mentored for several years by Super producers The Underdogs with an acquaintance, Quentin, under Luke & Q. He was signed directly to J Records by Clive Davis himself and later wrote songs for musicians such as Chris Brown, Britney Spears, and Justin Bieber. In 2011, James released his first mixtape, #Luke. The mixtape's critically acclaimed single "I Want You" earned him a Best R&B Performance nomination at the 56th Annual Grammy Awards. Like the first project, he released his second mixtape, Whispers in the Dark, as a free music download in 2012. His self-titled debut studio album was released on September 23, 2014.

In August 2017, James released "Drip," which he tapped A$AP Ferg for the remix 3 months later. On Jan 31, 2020, James released his second album "to feel love/d" which marks his return to music following a two-year hiatus to focus on acting. The album was released in partnership with his manager Jonathan Azu's record label and management company Culture Collective and featured guest performances by BJ The Chicago Kid, Ro James, Big K.R.I.T, Kirk Franklin, and Samoht. On November 24, 2020 "to feel love/d" was nominated in the category of Best R&B Album for the 63rd Grammy Awards.

In his acting career, he starred as R&B singer Johnny Gill in the 2017 TV biopic of R&B sextet New Edition in BET's The New Edition Story. Since then he's been seen in the Regina Hall and Will Packer film Little, As Noah Brooks in FOX's Star, HBO's Insecure, USA's Unsolved: The Murders of Tupac and the Notorious B.I.G., and BET's The Bobby Brown Story. He will also be featured in the third season of The Chi starting June 21, 2020.

Early life and career beginnings
Born in New Orleans, Louisiana, and raised by a single mother, James was influenced by an eclectic array of genres, particularly jazz and R&B. James said his love for music started when he watched a contestant perform a cover version of Donny Hathaway's version of "A Song for You" on Showtime at the Apollo. He said "I got chills. And I get that feeling all over again whenever I think about that performance. At the time, I'd never said I wanted to be a singer; I just knew I wanted to entertain. And I'd never heard of Donny. But when my mother found her copy of one of his records, I knew then that I wanted to reach people that way."

As a child, James was inspired by several recording artists and musicians such as Marvin Gaye, Willie Nelson, Harold Melvin and the Blue Notes, Alabama, among others. He credits his mother for introducing him to all kinds of music. James attended St. Augustine with schoolmate, (and future OFWGKTA member) singer-songwriter Frank Ocean. While in St. Augustine, he joined a musical trio named Upskale with Quinten Spears (known as Q) and Tah for a brief period, which introduced him to his longtime manager, director, and choreographer Frank Gatson. Q and James later formed a duo called Luke & Q, where James performed under the name Luke The Singer. Shortly after forming the group, the duo was able to be the opening act for R&B artist and  Tyrese Gibson during one of his concerts. However, after the failure to garner both James and Q much recognition, they decided to both part ways.

2007–present: songwriting and breakthrough
After disbanding, James honed his skills as a songwriter, quickly hooked up with producer Danja, and began to craft hits for those in the pop, R&B and soul genres. He also worked alongside Tank. He then began to co-write hits, such as Chris Brown's "Crawl" for his third album, Graffiti. In addition to writing for Brown, he also wrote (or co-wrote) hits for pop artists such as Justin Bieber ("That Should Be Me"), Britney Spears ("Kill the Lights") and Keri Hilson ("Do It").

In 2005, he appeared in Destiny's Child's Soldier video, with the members of the Upskale music trio. In 2011, he was personally selected by R&B singer Beyoncé to appear as a model/actor in her "Run the World (Girls)" music video. In December 2011, he released his debut extended play (EP) album #Luke as a free digital download. His first single, "I Want You", received universal acclaim from critics for its production and for James' vocal performance. The single later earned him a nomination for Best New Artist at the 2012 Soul Train Music Awards. Upon release of his second free digital mixtape, Whispers in the Dark, in December 2012, James began to garner buzz for his formal self-titled debut album, which is expected to be released from Def Jam in early 2014. On January 8, 2013, the album's first single, "Make Love to Me", was released to iTunes one month after the music video directed by Frank Gatson. At the 56th Annual Grammy Awards, James was nominated for Best R&B Performance award for his 2012 single "I Want You" (but he lost to Usher's "Climax"). On February 7, 2013, the song "I.O.U." was released as the second single from his anticipated debut album.
In 2013, he was personally chosen by Beyoncé to be an opening act for her Mrs. Carter Show World Tour.
In August 2013 he released a video for "Oh God" featuring Hit-Boy; the music video was directed by Sarah McColgan.
On December 4, 2013, he released another visual for "Strawberry Vapors", also directed by Sarah McColgan, the song was another release off the Whispers in the Dark album. On December 5, 2014, James received his second career Grammy Award nomination for Best R&B Song for "Options (Wolfjames Version)".

In 2016, James auditioned for the role of Singer Johnny Gill in the BET Biopic Miniseries The New Edition Story, after being considered by long time music associate Elijah Kelley. Both were cast in the biopic (with Kelley in the role of Ricky Bell). From 2017–2019, James played Noah Brooks in the main cast of Lee Daniels' Musical Drama, Star on FOX. Later in 2019, he was cast in Will Packer's Little alongside Regina Hall and Issa Rae.

Discography
Studio albums
 Luke James (2014)
 to feel love/d (2020)
 For No Reason (2020) 

Mixtapes
 #Luke (2011)
 Whispers in the Dark (2012)

Singles

Filmography

Films
Rift (as Freddy Davis) (2011)
Black Nativity (as Jo Jo) (2013)
 Little (as Trevor) (2019)
Christmas in Harmony  (2021)

Television
 2003 – Half & Half (as "Tyrese's background singer")
 2016 – The New Edition Story (as "Johnny Gill")
 2017 – Star (as "Noah Brooks")
 2018 – Unsolved: The Murders of Tupac and the Notorious B.I.G. (as "Sean Combs")
 2018 – The Bobby Brown Story (as "Johnny Gill")
 2020 - The Chi (as Trig)
 2021 - Genius: Aretha (as Glynn Turman)

Videography
 "4 AM" (2011)
 "I Want You" (2012) 
 "Mo' Better Blues" (2013) 
 "Make Love To Me" (2013) 
 "Love Chile" (2013) 
 "I.O.U." (2013) 
 "Oh God" (2013) 
 "Strawberry Vapors" (2013) 
 "Superpower" (2013)
 "Options" (2014) 
 "Dancing In The Dark" (2014) 
 "Exit Wounds" (2014)
 "Drip" (2017)
 "Run the World" (2011)
 "Go Girl" (2019)

Tours
 BET Music Matters Tour (with Estelle), (2012)
 The Mrs. Carter Show World Tour (opening act), (2013–14)
 Sweet Talker Tour (opening act for Jessie J), (2014–15)
 to feel love/d tour, (2020)

Awards and nominations

References

External links

African-American  male singer-songwriters
American soul singers
Living people
Musicians from New Orleans
1984 births
Singer-songwriters from Louisiana
21st-century African-American male singers